The Archdeacon of Kilfenora was a senior ecclesiastical officer within the Diocese of Kilfenora until 1643; the Archdiocese of Tuam until 1752; the Diocese of Killaloe and Kilfenora until 1834; and the Diocese of Killaloe and Clonfert until 1923 when it was amalgamated with Killaloe. 

The archdeaconry can trace its history back to Charles who held the office in 1302 through to the last discrete holder Arthur Tatton.

References

Sources
  
 

Archdeacons of Kilfenora
Lists of Anglican archdeacons in Ireland
Religion in County Clare